Henry Bourne (1694–1733) was a British historian.

Henry Bourne may also refer to:

Henry C. Bourne Jr. (1921–2010), American electrical engineer and university administrator
Henry Bourne (MP), British politician
Henry Fox Bourne (1837–1909), British social reformer and writer

See also
Henry Bourne Joy (1864–1936), president of the Packard Motor Car Company